The Vizsla is a dog breed from Hungary and belongs to the Federation Cynologique Internationale (FCI) group 7 (Pointing Dogs), the Canadian Kennel Club (CKC) group 1 (Sporting group), and the American Kennel Club (Sporting group). The Hungarian or Magyar Vizsla or Smooth-Haired Vizsla are sporting dogs and loyal companions. The Vizsla's medium size is one of the breed's most appealing characteristics. As a hunter of fowl and upland game, the Vizsla has held a prominent position among sporting dogs – that of household companion and family dog.

The Vizsla is a natural hunter endowed with an excellent nose and outstanding trainability. It was bred to work in fields, forests or bodies of water. Although they are lively, gentle-mannered, demonstrably affectionate and sensitive, they are also fearless and possess a well-developed protective instinct.

Description

Appearance

The Vizsla is a short-coated hunting dog of distinguished appearance and bearing. Robust, but rather lightly built, they are lean dogs that have defined muscles.

Various breeds are often mistaken for Vizslas and vice versa. Redbone Coonhounds, Weimaraners and Rhodesian Ridgebacks are most commonly mixed up. The body structure of a Vizsla is very similar in appearance to a Weimaraner and a Redbone Coonhound, though the Vizsla is typically leaner with a more defined musculature. However, Weimaraners and Rhodesian Ridgebacks are larger than Vizslas.

The nose of the Vizsla will always have a reddish color that blends with the coat color. Black, brown, light pink, or another color nose is an indication of another breed. A Vizsla's eye and nail color should also blend with the coat color.

Color and coats

The standard coat is French-row yellow in several shadings. The coat could also be described as a yellow, copper-brown color, russet gold, and dark sandy gold. Solid, dark, mahogany red and pale yellow are considered faults and a disqualification in competitions. Small areas of white on the fore-chest, neck, or tail are permissible but not preferred. Some variations in the Vizsla coat color along their back (saddle-type marks) are typical.

The American Kennel Club (AKC) breed standards for the Vizsla states that the coat should be short, smooth, dense, and close-lying, without a woolly undercoat. The Vizsla is not suited to being kept outside since, unlike most other breeds, it does not have an undercoat. They are self-cleaning dogs and rarely need to be bathed, if ever. They have little noticeable "dog smell" detectable by humans. After several forays into lakes and streams they will develop an aroma that is a weaker version of the 'wet dog' smell. A quick bath and this odor will vanish.

Size
The Vizsla is a medium-sized dog, The average height and weight:

Males
Height: 
Weight: 
Females
Height: 
Weight:

Tail

The Vizsla holds its tail horizontal to the ground and wags it vigorously while charging through rough scrub and undergrowth.

The American breed standard calls for the tail to be docked to two-thirds of its original length, though docking for cosmetic reasons is opposed by the American Veterinary Medical Association, the American Animal Hospital Association, and the Canadian Veterinary Medical Association. UK's Kennel Club breed standard permits both a docked tail or a natural tail; this accommodates laws in England & Wales and in Scotland which outlaw docking for cosmetic reasons but exempt docking in newborn working dogs.

The docked tail of the Vizsla is significantly longer than that of other dogs with traditionally docked tails such as the Weimaraner, Dobermann, Boxer, and Australian Shepherd. Since the tail is docked when the puppy is less than three days old, this longer dock can result in some variation in tail length among Vizsla dogs from different breeding programs.

Temperament
Vizslas are very energetic, gentle-mannered, loyal, caring, and very affectionate. They quickly form close bonds with their owners, children, and even strangers. Often, they are referred to as "velcro" dogs because of their loyalty and affection. Vizslas will cry or whine when they feel neglected or are otherwise unhappy. Some will bark at strangers if they feel that they are invading the "pack" space. They are very good guard dogs when trained to be so.

They are natural hunters with an excellent ability to take training. Not only are they great pointers, but they are excellent retrievers as well. They will retrieve on land and in the water making the most of their natural instincts. However, they must be trained gently and without harsh commands or strong physical correction, as they have sensitive temperaments and can be easily damaged if trained too harshly. However the owner must show quiet authority in training, otherwise the dog is likely to take over the training session. 

Vizslas thrive on attention, exercise, and interaction. They are intelligent dogs and need a lot of mental stimulation when young. If left alone for long hours, they can be bored and become destructive. With proper socialization and training, Vizslas are very gentle dogs that can be great around children. The Vizsla wants to be close to its owner as much as possible, and it is commonly observed that vizslas insist on sleeping under the covers in their owner's bed at night.

Health

The American Kennel Club states that a typical lifespan for the Vizsla is between 12 and 14 years, while a 2008 Vizsla Club of America survey puts the average lifespan of the Vizsla at 9.15 years. The Vizsla is considered to be a robust dog but some localized breeding programs using a small number of dogs have led to heritable illnesses in some offspring including:
 Hip dysplasia is very rare but possible.
 Canine epilepsy
 Cancer (mast cell tumors, hemangiosarcoma, lymphoma)
 Sebaceous adenitis
Responsible breeders do not select dogs for breeding if they have such inherent problems.
Vizslas can also suffer from hypothyroidism, dwarfism, persistent right aortic arch, tricuspid valve dysplasia, and progressive retinal atrophy. Major risks include epilepsy and lymphosarcoma. Vizslas can also be prone to skin and food allergies.

History

The first written reference to the Vizsla dog breed has been recorded in the Illustrated Vienna Chronicle prepared on order of King Louis I of Hungary by the Carmelite Friars in 1357.

The Vizsla has survived the Turkish occupation (1526–1696), the Hungarian Revolution of 1848, World War I, World War II and the Hungarian People's Republic. However, Vizslas faced and survived several near-extinctions in their history, including being overrun by English Pointers and German Shorthaired Pointers in the 1800s (Boggs, 2000:19) and again to near-extinction after World War II. A careful search of Hungary and a poll of Hungarian sportsmen revealed only about a dozen Vizslas of the true type still alive in the country. From that minimum stock, the breed rose to prominence once again. The various "strains" of the Vizsla have become somewhat distinctive as individuals bred stock that suited their hunting style. Outside Hungary, vizslas were commonly bred in Romania, Austria, Slovakia, and Serbia.

The Vizsla started arriving in the United States at the close of World War II. As interest in and devotion to the breed began to increase, owners formed the Vizsla Club of America in order to gain AKC recognition. As a result of registering foundation stock with the AKC, Vizsla owners were able to obtain official recognition on 25 November 1960, as the Vizsla became the 115th breed recognized by the American Kennel Club.

The Vizsla was used in development of other breeds, most notably the Weimaraner, Wirehaired Vizsla and German Shorthaired Pointer breeds. There is much conjecture about those same breeds, along with other pointer breeds, being used to reestablish the Vizsla breed at the end of the 19th century.

Vizsla in the UK 
Approximately 4,520 Vizsla puppies are registered with the Kennel Club of Great Britain (KC) each year, making the breed one of the top 50 most popular. The number is steadily rising year after year as more people recognize the breed. There are two breed clubs for the Vizsla in Britain, The Hungarian Vizsla Club and The Hungarian Vizsla Society. The winner of the Best In Show award at Crufts 2010 was a Vizsla named Hungargunn Bear It'n Mind.

In popular culture
 Dana Perino, the former White House Press Secretary and cohost of The Five, had owned a Vizsla, Henry. After the dog's death, Perino got another Vizsla, Jasper. After Jasper's death, she got one more Vizsla, Percy.
 Kubrick the Dog, a 2011 photography book by British fashion photographer and film maker Sean Ellis as a tribute to his Vizsla dog named Kubrick.
 Comedian Drew Lynch had a Vizsla, Stella, as a service dog, until 2022. They hosted a YouTube series called "Dog Vlog".
 Former American professional baseball pitcher Mark Buehrle and his family own three Vizslas: Diesel, Drake, and Duke.
 Professional basketball player Kevin Love owns a Vizsla
 Former George W. Bush White House Communications Director and current MSNBC show host Nicolle Wallace has two Vizslas

See also
 Dogs portal
 List of dog breeds
 National symbols of Hungary
 Wirehaired Vizsla, a breed developed in the 1930s by interbreeding Vizsla and German Wirehaired Pointer
 Hungarian dog breeds

References

Further reading
 Boggs, B. C. The Vizsla; Glenbrier Publishing Company; Revised Edition, 1972. .
 Coffman, Marion I. Versatile Vizsla; Alpine Blue Ribbon Books; 2nd edition (May 2004). .
 Hart, Ernest H. Vizslas; TFH Publications, 1990. .
 Pinney, Chris C., D.V.M. Vizslas: A Complete Owner's Guide; Barron's, 1898. .
 White, Robert L. Hungarian Vizsla; PetLove Books (Published in UK by Interpret Books). .

External links

	
 

FCI breeds
Dog breeds originating in Hungary
Gundogs
Pointers
Hungarian words and phrases